Christopher Van Hollen could refer to: 

Christopher Van Hollen (diplomat) (1922-2013), American diplomat
Chris Van Hollen (born 1959), United States senator from Maryland and son of Christopher Van Hollen